Bohumil Smrček (born 3 July 1961) is a Czech football manager.

External links
 

1961 births
Living people
Czech football managers
SV Horn managers